Mohd Zulkifli Affendi Mohd Zakri (born 14 July 1982) is a Malaysian football player. Previously he played and served as captain for club team Kuala Lumpur United.  He Currently he plays for FAM League club team Penjara F.C.

He played as a Kuala Lumpur youth and senior player before moving to Kedah before loaned to Perlis at middle of the 2006 season. He then signed with FAM Cup league outfit, DBKL FC before moving to Proton FC.

Mohd Zulkifli has played for Malaysia national youth team.

References

Malaysian footballers
Living people
1982 births
Kuala Lumpur City F.C. players
Kedah Darul Aman F.C. players
Perlis FA players
Sportspeople from Kuala Lumpur
Malaysian people of Malay descent
Association football midfielders